The  or  is a national registry of Japanese citizens. It was ruled constitutional by the Supreme Court of Japan on March 6, 2008 amidst strong opposition.

The percentage of popularization of the smartcard (called Juki-card) is of such a low ratio that there is a strong view amongst the general public that the system will end in failure.

Registry content 
The registry contains the following information for each citizen:
 Name
 Address
 Date of birth
 Gender
 An 11-digit individual identification number

Implementation 
The initial phase of the network started on August 5, 2002, which implemented, literally, Three statutes for online government and local government executive procedure on June 7, 2003, and full operation on August 25, 2003.

Among more than 1,700 local governments in Japan, only two (Kunitachi, Tokyo and Yamatsuri, Fukushima) have refused to join the network as of May 2009.

The registry is opposed by the Democratic Party of Japan, the Liberal Party, the Japanese Communist Party and the Social Democratic Party.

See also 
 Jūminhyō

References

External links 
 Local Authorities Systems Development Center
Civil registries
Politics of Japan
Government databases in Japan
Databases in Japan
2002 establishments in Japan